A hood is a kind of headgear that covers most of the head and neck, and sometimes the face. Hoods that cover mainly the sides and top of the head, and leave the face mostly or partly open may be worn for protection from the environment (typically cold weather or rain), for fashion, as a form of traditional dress or uniform, or in the case of knights, an armoured hood is used for protection against bladed weapons. In some cases, hoods are used to prevent the wearer from seeing where they are going (e.g., in cases where a prisoner is hooded). Hoods with eye holes may be used for religious purposes to prevent the wearer from being seen. In the case of Ku Klux Klan members, terrorists, or criminals such as robbers, a hood with eye holes helps prevent identification.

Etymology
The word traces back to Old English hod "hood," from Proto-Germanic *hodaz (cf. Old Saxon, Old Frisian hod "hood," Middle Dutch hoet, Dutch hoed "hat," Old High German huot "helmet, hat, Gugel", German Hut "hat," Old Frisian hode "guard, protection"), from PIE *kadh- "cover". The modern spelling was developed in the 15th century to indicate a "long" vowel which is no longer pronounced as such.

History and description
Historically, hoods were either similar to modern hoods, often forming part of a cloak or cape, or a separate form of headgear. Hoods with short capes, called chaperons in French, were extremely common in medieval Europe, and later evolved into big hats. Soft hoods were worn by men under hats. Hoods have also been used as part of uniforms for  organizations such as the Ku Klux Klan.

A hood to hide or control the wearer often covers the whole head, with the result that the wearer can see little or nothing, like a blindfold, or it can be to prevent identification of the wearer. It may be used on or by a person who has been arrested or kidnapped, or about to suffer judicial execution; this practice is known as hooding. The hood may be simply a bag; it may be intended to be, and/or experienced as, humiliating (see hood event).

Traditional women's hoods varied from close-fitting, soft headgear (e.g. snood) to stiffened, structured hoods (e.g. gable hood) or very large coverings made of material over a frame which fashionable women wore over towering wigs or hairstyles to protect them from the elements (e.g. calash).

Today, fashion hoods are generally soft headcoverings which form part of robbing a larger garment (e.g. an overcoat, shirt or cloak; an exception is a rain hood which is not part of a larger garment). They can be pulled up over the head when needed, or left to hang down the back when not.  They may also be detachable to turn a winter overcoat into a summer one, or may be designed to be folded or rolled into a small pocket in the neck of the garment when not in use.  A familiar type of soft and smooth fashion hood is the visored bubble rainhood, which consists of a 3-sectioned bucket-style bubble hood with its 2 side sections extending frontwards towards the front center of the neck.  The distinguishing feature is a curvy, wavy swerve U-bowl shaped duckbill pouf visor, which serves as a shield to guard the eyes, so that rain water or snow does not get in contact with the face.  The rainhood visor is sometimes flipped slightly upwards, or cupped upwards into a pouf; the outermost swoop curve may then dip downwards towards the wearer’s eyes for added protection.  Small clips are affixed to the sides along the hood next to the visor to help it keep its pouffed shape.

Types
The Inuit peoples of the Arctic are expert clothing manufacturers, and the women's anorak, technically called an amauti, features a large hood used to shelter an infant on its mother's back.

In Japan hoods covered with chainmail or armour plates (tatami zukin) were worn by samurai warriors and their retainers.

Scuba divers who dive in cold water often wear neoprene wetsuit hoods for thermal insulation or watertight latex rubber drysuit hoods to prevent water ingress. They cover the whole head and neck except the face.

Academic dress

An academic hood is a component of academic dress that is an often bright and decorative garment worn over a gown and used only at graduations or on other special occasions. The shape of hoods of universities and colleges in the UK and in many Commonwealth countries have been derived from those prescribed at the Universities of Oxford and Cambridge.  Oxford bachelors and masters use a 'simple' (or 'Burgon' shape) consisting of hood with a cowl (headcovering) but without a cape, whereas the University of Cambridge uses a 'full' shape, with both cowl and square cape and substantial liripipe for all hoods. Other English universities use one of these patterns or adapt them; for example, the University of London uses the full Cambridge shape but with rounded corners to the cape. Newer universities, such as the University of Kent use a hood with triangular cape but with no cowl, and with a distinctive V shaped segment denoting the faculty.  The hoods of the University of Aberdeen have a rounded flat cape but no cowl.

The pattern of hoods in the US largely follow an intercollegiate code. The length of the hood and the width of its velvet trim indicate the academic achievement level of the wearer; the color of the trim indicates the discipline/field in which the degree is held; and the lining of hoods in academic dress represents the particular institution from which the degree was earned.

See also
Balaclava (clothing)
Bondage hood
Burqini
French Hood
Gable hood
Headscarf
Hoodie
Sartorial hijab
 Cucullus (disambiguation), a Latin word meaning hood

References

 
Academic dress
Safety
Medieval European costume